All the K-Pop was a South Korean variety show, which aired Tuesday nights on the MBC Music channel. The show was hosted by Boom, Park Jae-min and MBLAQ's Mir.

Episodes 23 and 25 were the two most-viewed Korean videos (not counting music videos and music shows) on YouTube in 2013, and episode 26 ranked eighth. These three videos had 6.7 million views at the end of the year, with about 80 percent them from other countries.

Hosts
Boom

Mir (MBLAQ)

Guest MCs
Seungho (MBLAQ)
Min (Miss A)

List of episodes

References 

South Korean variety television shows
MBC TV original programming
2012 South Korean television series debuts
2013 South Korean television series endings